Hrkać is a Slavic surname.

List of people
Persons with the surname Hrkać include:
 Alexander Hrkać, president of KK Vrijednosnice Osijek
 Ante Hrkać (born 1992), Bosnian professional footballer
 Miljenko Hrkać (1947–1978), Croatian alleged terrorist
 Mirko Hrkać, futsal player in the Bosnia and Herzegovina national futsal team

See also
 Hrkáč, former village that merged into Gemerská Ves
 Tony Hrkac, Canadian former professional ice hockey player
 Hrkaći, a hamlet of Izbično

Slavic-language surnames
Croatian surnames